HMS Torrent was a Royal Navy R-class destroyer constructed and then operational in the First World War. She was sunk, with most of her crew in 1917. On 23 December 1917 , HMS Torrent, and  sank after entering an Imperial German minefield.

Construction
Torrent was ordered from Swan Hunter by the British Admiralty in March 1916 as part of the Eighth War Construction Programme.  The ship was launched at Swan Hunter's Wallsend, Tyne and Wear shipyard on 26 November 1916 and completed in February 1917.

Armament consisted of three QF 4in Mk IV guns on the ship's centreline, with one on the forecastle, one aft on a raised bandstand and one between the second and third funnels. A single 2-pounder (40 mm) pom-pom anti-aircraft gun was fitted, while torpedo armament consisted of four 21 inch (533 mm) torpedoes in two twin mounts. The ship had a complement of 82 officers and men.

Service
On commissioning, Torrent joined the 10th Destroyer Flotilla of the Harwich Force. Torrent was one of a group of four light cruisers and nine destroyers patrolling off the Thornton Bank. S20 was immobilised by a hit in the boiler room and was sunk, while S15, although heavily damaged, was able to escape, with the British destroyers turning back to avoid fire from shore batteries.

One of the duties of the Harwich Force destroyers was the so-called "Beef Run", convoys to and from The Netherlands. Torrent was part of the escort of a Netherlands-bound convoy on 22 December, when the destroyer  struck a mine and was badly damaged, having to be towed to Harwich by the destroyer . The remainder of the convoy reached the Hook of Holland safely, and the escort waited near the Maas Light Buoy for the return convoy. At about 02:00 hr on 23 December, Torrent,  and  ran into a German minefield, with Torrent striking a German mine. Surprise and Tornado went to rescue Torrents crew, but Torrent struck a second mine and quickly sank. In an attempt to rescue survivors, Surprise and Tornado also struck mines and sank. Only Radiant was undamaged and picked up the survivors from the three ships. In total, 12 officers and 240 other ranks were killed from the three ships. Only three of Torrents crew survived, with 68 killed.

Notes

Citations

Bibliography
 

 

 

 

World War I destroyers of the United Kingdom
R-class destroyers (1916)
1916 ships